Grandview is a city in Johnson County, Texas, United States. The population was 1,561 at the 2010 census and an estimated 1,753 in 2018.

David's Supermarkets, an independent chain of grocery stores, was headquartered in Grandview before being acquired by Brookshire Brothers in 2014.

Grandview's school district was ranked one of the best school districts in the state of Texas as of (2016).

Geography

Grandview is located in southeastern Johnson County at  (32.265690, –97.177768). Interstate 35W runs through the east side of the city, leading north  to the center of Fort Worth and south  to Hillsboro. Texas State Highway 81 leads through the center of Grandview, leading south  to Itasca.

Demographics

As of the 2020 United States census, there were 1,879 people, 702 households, and 458 families residing in the city.

Education
The city is served by the Grandview Independent School District.

References

External links
 City of Grandview official site
 Grandview Chamber of Commerce
 Grandview in the Handbook of Texas

Dallas–Fort Worth metroplex
Cities in Texas
Cities in Johnson County, Texas